The Misadventures of Awkward Black Girl is a 2015 memoir written by Issa Rae. In the book, Rae chronicles her life through a series of humorous autobiographical essays and stories. The book's title is taken from Rae's popular web series of the same name, often simply referred to as Awkward Black Girl (2013–2015). Upon release, the book became a New York Times best-seller.

References 

2015 non-fiction books
American autobiographies
American memoirs
English-language books
Debut books